Saint James United Church is a heritage church in the city's downtown core of Montreal, Quebec, Canada. It is a Protestant church affiliated with the United Church of Canada. It is located at 463 Saint Catherine Street West between Saint Alexandre and City Councillors Streets (McGill metro station), in the borough of Ville-Marie within Downtown Montreal. It was designated as a National Historic Site of Canada in 1996.

The Gothic Revival church was designed by Montreal architect Alexander Francis Dunlop. It is noteworthy for its false apse housing church offices and for its Casavant Frères organ.

History
When it was built in June 1889, it was the largest Methodist church in Canada, with 2,000 seats; it was nicknamed the "Cathedral Church of Methodism." It now belongs to the United Church of Canada, into which the Canadian Methodists merged in 1925. Its congregation founded the first YMCA in North America on November 25, 1851 (before the present church building was built) and led an active campaign for women's suffrage early in the 20th century.

A World War I memorial window (1924) by Charles William Kelsey depicting a trench scene at St. James United Church (Montreal) was dedicated to 32 members who were killed overseas and 267 others who served in the Great War. The side lights represent the cardinal virtues, Justice, Prudence, Temperance and Fortitude.

In 1927, to cover upkeep costs, the church permitted a commercial building to be built in front of its Sainte Catherine Street façade. The building, adjoining the church's structure, concealed the church for over 78 years, the church itself being announced by a large neon sign.

In 2005, as part of an $8-million restoration effort sponsored by the city of Montreal and the Quebec government, a portion of the commercial buildings were demolished, once again revealing the facade of the church as well as a new public square designed by Quebec architect Claude Cormier. Access has also been restored to the rear lawn from Sainte Catherine Street.

Gallery

See also
Christ Church Cathedral (Montreal)

References

External links

Saint James United Church official site
Religious Heritage - The story of St. James United
Saint James, la résurrection (La Presse, August 20, 2005)

James United Church
James United Church (Montreal)
James United Church (Montreal)
National Historic Sites in Quebec
Downtown Montreal
James United Church (Montreal)
James United Church (Montreal)
Heritage buildings of Quebec